is a 2019 Japanese animated film produced by Science Saru and directed by Masaaki Yuasa. The film premiered at the Annecy International Animated Film Festival on June 10, 2019 and was released in Japan on June 21, 2019.

Plot
19-year-old Hinako Mukaimizu moves to an oceanside town to attend college and go surfing, without future thoughts. When the fireworks set the apartment ablaze, she is rescued by Minato Hinageshi, a 21-year-old firefighter with a strong sense of justice. Hinako is drawn to his capable personality, and they bond when he learns how to surf. They spend time together. After telling Hinako the waves are the best to surf in, Minato sacrifices himself to save a jetskiier from drowning.

Hinako is distraught by his death and moves to an apartment away from the beach. One day, she finds out he appears in water whenever she sings "Brand New Story", a song the two of them often sang together. While the others cannot see him, Hinako and Minato spend time with each other again, even in public. However, Minato is reminded of his mortality, after realizing he cannot physically touch Hinako and when his co-worker, Wasabi, confesses to her. He asks Hinako to move on with her life, but she declines. However, she realizes she is too reliant on him after she stops him from going to heaven. When Hinako goes to pay her respects at Minato's house, his sister Yōko tells her what inspired Minato to become a firefighter. Hinako learns she was the one who saved Minato from drowning when they were young, and when she unlocks his phone, she reads his drafted text message telling her to "ride her own wave." She enrolls in a lifeguard training course, hoping to stop being dependent on Minato. Meanwhile, Yōko confesses to Wasabi, reminding him he had inspired her to return to school when she was bullied.

At her part-time job, Yōko overhears the same group that set off the previous fireworks planning to do so again at the abandoned building housing a large Christmas tree. Hinako accompanies her as they tail the group to collect evidence. The fireworks cause the building set ablaze, and Hinako and Yōko are trapped. However, Hinako summons Minato, who sends a wave of water up the building, extinguishing the fire. Hinako and Yōko ride on a backboard down the wave. After exchanging final farewells with Yōko, Wasabi and Hinako, Minato's spirit ascends to heaven. The next Christmas, Hinako, Yōko and Wasabi, the latter two now dating, visit the Chiba Port Tower to celebrate Hinako receiving her lifeguard certification. As Yōko and Wasabi leave, Hinako sings to a fountain, but Minato does not appear. The tower reads a message he wrote for her the previous year and Hinako sadly breaks down. Afterwards, Hinako continues spending her lifeguard duty and surfing.

Voice cast

A 21-year-old firefighter interested in Hinako, whom he calls his hero. He is talented in cooking.

A 19-year-old college student, part-time florist and a surfer.

Minato's younger sister and a high school student working part-time at a café. Her nickname is blue-ringed octopus.

Minato's firefighting partner.

Production
The film was announced at the Tokyo International Film Festival in 2018, where Yuasa stated that he would direct. He described the film as a "simple romantic comedy" that will have "a lot of exciting scenes", including some depicting the contrast between water and fire. Yuasa compared life to "riding a wave", using it as the basis for the story. The film was produced by Science Saru. Reiko Yoshida served as the scriptwriter and Michiru Oshima served as a music composer. Rina Kawaei and Generations from Exile Tribe member Ryota Katayose joined the cast on leading roles in January 2019, with the film being Katayose's first voice acting role. Honoka Matsumoto and Kentaro Ito joined the cast on supporting roles in February 2019. The film's theme song is "Brand New Story" by Generations from Exile Tribe. A music video animated by Science Saru, featuring the members and new original scenes from the film, released on June 21, 2019. To promote the film, a two-chapter manga adaptation by Machi Kiachi was serialized in Deluxe BetsuComi, which contains an original story about Hinako and Minato. On July 2, 2019, GKIDS announced they had licensed the film in North America and was released in 2020.

Release
The film premiered in Japan on June 21, 2019. It premiered in the United Kingdom at Scotland Loves Anime on October 11, 2019, ahead of a home-video release via distributor Anime Limited on November 23, 2020. In China, the film was released theatrically by distributor JL Film Entertainment; the release was originally scheduled for August 7, 2019, but was delayed until December 7, 2019. The film was released theatrically in North America by GKIDS, first as a one-day special screening on February 19 in cooperation with Fathom Events, and subsequently via traditional release on February 21, 2020. It was later released by GKIDS and Shout! Factory on Blu-ray and DVD on August 4, 2020, with a streaming release on HBO Max following on January 12, 2021.

Reception
On Metacritic, which assigns a weighted average score out of 100 to reviews from mainstream critics, the film received an average score of 63 out of 100 based on 9 reviews, indicating "generally favorable reviews".

Matt Schley from The Japan Times gave the film four out of five stars, complimenting the "charming cast of characters," while mentioning the film seemed too "normal" for a work by Yuasa. Writing for the Los Angeles Times, Charles Solomon called the film Yuasa's "best anime yet", citing its believable characters and polished animation style. Peter Debruge from Variety noted that the film's use of a hit single as its theme song helped broaden its appeal to a more mainstream audience, but also criticized it for pushing its romance themes too strong.

The film became one of the Jury Recommended Works in the Animation category at the 23rd Japan Media Arts Festival in 2020.

Accolades

References

External links
 

2010s Japanese films
2019 anime films
2019 films
Films about firefighting
2010s Japanese-language films
Japanese animated fantasy films
Japanese romantic fantasy films
Japanese sports films
Science Saru
Seven Seas Entertainment titles
Surfing films
Animated romance films
Toho animated films
Films scored by Michiru Ōshima
Anime with original screenplays
Films set in Chiba Prefecture